Aespa (commonly stylized in all lowercase or æspa) is a South Korean girl group formed by SM Entertainment. The group consists of four members: Karina, Giselle, Winter, and Ningning. They debuted on November 17, 2020, with the single "Black Mamba".

Name
The group's name, Aespa, combines the English initials of "avatar" and "experience" (Avatar X Experience) with the English word "aspect", meaning "two sides", to symbolize the idea of "meeting another self and experiencing the new world".

Career

2016–2019: Pre-debut activities

Ningning was introduced as a member of pre-debut training team SM Rookies on September 19, 2016. As part of the team, she appeared on the Rookies Princess: Who's the Best? segment of the program My SMT that year and recorded several covers for the Korean animated TV program Shining Star in 2017.

Karina appeared in labelmate Taemin's music video for the song "Want" in February 2019 and performed with him on several music programs in the following weeks.

2020–2021: Introduction, debut, and Savage
On October 26, 2020, SM Entertainment announced that it would debut a new girl group, its first since Red Velvet in 2014 and its first overall idol group since NCT in 2016. The group's name and members were revealed individually starting on October 27 (in order: Winter, Karina, Ningning, and Giselle). SM Entertainment founder Lee Soo-man explained the group's concept at the 2020 World Cultural Industry Forum on October 28. A video trailer featuring all four members was revealed on November 2, alongside the announcement of the release of Aespa's debut single, "Black Mamba", on November 17. The group made their broadcast debut on KBS2's Music Bank on November 20 to perform "Black Mamba". The song reached number one on the K-pop music video charts of China's biggest music-streaming service, QQ Music, for three consecutive weeks and earned Aespa their first music show win on SBS's Inkigayo on January 17, 2021.

On January 29, 2021, SM Entertainment announced Aespa would release a remake of "Forever", the single originally by Yoo Young-jin for SM Entertainment's 2000 holiday album Winter Vacation in SMTOWN.com. Aespa's version of the song, a "mid-tempo ballad characterized by acoustic guitar sound" with "warm lyrics about promising forever to a loved one", was released on February 5 that year.

On May 4, 2021, SM Entertainment announced Aespa would release a new single titled "Next Level", a dance and hip-hop track with a "groovy" rap, "energetic" bass, and "powerful vocals". It was released on May 17. It debuted at number nine on the Gaon Digital Chart and peaked at number two, becoming their first top five hit in South Korea. "Next Level" became Aespa's third song to chart on the Billboard World Digital Song Sales chart, peaking at number three. On July 22, 2021, Aespa was announced to have signed with Creative Artists Agency for their future activities in United States. On September 10, 2021, it was announced that remix versions of "Next Level" will be released on September 14, along with a music video and a visualizer video for "Next Level (IMLAY Remix)".

On September 14, 2021, SM Entertainment announced Aespa would release their first extended play, Savage. The album contains six tracks, including the lead single of the same name. It was released on October 5. The extended play marked Aespa's first and highest entry on the US Billboard 200, peaking at number 20, and debuted atop the Gaon Album Chart. Within 15 days of release, Savage was reported to have sold 513,292 copies. Aespa performed at the 2021 Macy's Thanksgiving Day Parade, making them the first Korean girl group to perform at the event. On December 2, they won their first Daesang (Stage of the Year) at the Asia Artist Awards. Two days later, on December 4, the group won their second Daesang (Record of the Year) at the 2021 Melon Music Awards.

On November 4, it was announced that Aespa would be releasing a remake of S.E.S.'s "Dreams Come True" on December 20. The music video for the song was directed by Lucid Colour and choreographed and visually directed by BoA. The song peaked at number eight on the Gaon Digital Chart and at number seven on the Billboard World Digital Songs chart.

On December 26, Karina and Winter were revealed as members of the supergroup Got the Beat. The supergroup debuted with the single "Step Back" on January 3, 2022.

2022–present: Coachella, Girls, and first concert

On January 8, 2022, Aespa became the inaugural winner of the Artist of the Year award at the 36th Golden Disc Awards. On April 19, it was announced that Aespa would be performing at Coachella on April 23, during the second week of the annual music festival. Their setlist included "Savage", "Next Level", "Black Mamba", and an English version of a then-unreleased song titled "Life's Too Short", which was revealed to be from their then-upcoming EP. On May 12, the group was included in Time magazine's Next Generation Leaders list. On May 27, the group was also included on Forbes' 30 Under 30.

On June 1, SM Entertainment announced that Aespa signed with Warner Records. They also announced that Aespa would release their second extended play, Girls, on July 8. Its nine tracks include the title track of the same name; their first two singles, "Black Mamba" and "Forever"; and "Dreams Come True", which they previously released as part of the 2021 Winter SM Town: SMCU Express album in December 2021. Two other tracks on Girls, "Illusion" and the English version of "Life's Too Short", preceded the EP and were released on June 1 and 24, respectively. Aespa delivered a speech and performed at the UN High-level Political Forum on Sustainable Development meeting on July 5. On December 14, the group released a collaborative single, "Beautiful Christmas", with labelmates Red Velvet for SM Town's album 2022 Winter SM Town: SMCU Palace.

On January 18, 2023, the group was announced as a performer at the annual Governors Ball Music Festival, making them the first K-pop group to participate in the festival. On January 20, SM Entertainment announced that the group would hold their first concert, Synk: Hyper Line, starting from February 25.

Endorsements
On February 10, 2021, Aespa became global ambassadors for Givenchy, the first K-pop artists chosen as such by the French fashion house. Later that year in August, Aespa inked endorsement deals with Korean cosmetics brand Clio, Korean skincare brand Mediheal, French sportswear brand Eider and in September for KB Kookmin Bank. On November 23, Aespa was selected as muses for Italian fragrance brand Acqua di Parma. 

On April 8, 2022, Aespa became the model for Korean beverage brand Lotte Chilsung's Tamz Zero. In August, Aespa became the global ambassador for the Korean sportswear brand MLB. In September, Aespa became the global ambassador for Swiss watch and jewelry brand Chopard. In December, Aespa became a promotional model for mobile game Epic Seven and duty free store Lotte Duty Free.

Members

 Karina – leader, dancer, rapper, vocalist
 Giselle – rapper, vocalist
 Winter – vocalist, dancer
 Ningning – vocalist

Discography

Extended plays

Singles

Promotional singles

Soundtrack appearances

Other charted songs

Filmography

Web shows

Videography

Music videos

Other videos

Concerts and tours

Headlining tour

Showcase

Concert participation

 SM Town Live "Culture Humanity" (2021)
 SM Town Live 2022: SMCU Express at Kwangya (2022)
 SM Town Live 2022: SMCU Express (2022)
 SM Town Live 2023: SMCU Palace at Kwangya (2023)

Awards and nominations

See also
 List of best-selling girl groups

Notes

References

External links

  

Aespa
2020 establishments in South Korea
K-pop music groups
Musical groups established in 2020
Musical groups from Seoul
South Korean girl groups
SM Entertainment artists
SM Town
South Korean dance music groups
Warner Records artists